Message from Maynard is an album released by Canadian jazz trumpeter Maynard Ferguson featuring tracks recorded in early 1962 and originally released on the Roulette label.

Reception 

AllMusic reviewer Scott Yanow stated "None of the originals caught on, but there are plenty of fine solos from the leader/trumpeter, Menza on tenor, altoist Lanny Morgan and pianist Abene; plus, the rhythm section is really pushed by drummer Rufus Jones".

Track listing 
All compositions by Don Menza except where noted.

 "September Moan" (Don Sebesky) – 4:04
 "Statement" – 6:08
 "Nude Mood" – 2:45
 "One for Otis" – 2:43
 "Reflection" – 2:49
 "Head Hunter" – 2:57
 "Lament for Susan" (Mike Abene) – 3:43
 "L & M" (Don Rader) – 3:06
 "Jennifer's Bounce" (Rader) – 2:21

Personnel 
Maynard Ferguson – trumpet, leader
John C. Gale, Gene A. Goe, Natale Pavone, Donald A. Rader – trumpet
Kenneth H. Rupp – trombone
Lanny Morgan – alto saxophone
Willie Maiden, Donald J. Menza – tenor saxophone
Frank J. Hittner, Jr. – baritone saxophone
Michael C. J. Abene – piano
Lincoln B. Milliman – bass
Rufus Jones – drums
Mike Abene (track 7), Don Menza (tracks 2–6), Don Rader (tracks 8 & 9, Don Sebesky (track 1) – arrangers

References 

1963 albums
Maynard Ferguson albums
Roulette Records albums
Albums produced by Teddy Reig
Albums arranged by Don Sebesky